The 2022 CFL season was the 68th season of modern-day Canadian football. Officially, it was the 64th season of the Canadian Football League. The regular season began on June 9 and ended on October 29, with 18 games played per team over 21 weeks. Regina hosted the 109th Grey Cup on November 20, 2022.

CFL news in 2022

Collective bargaining agreement and strike
The three-year agreement that was ratified between the CFL and CFL Player's Association expired just prior to this season, on May 15, which was the first day of scheduled training camp. After the CFL and CFLPA failed to come to an agreement before the deadline, players from seven of the nine teams formally went on strike on May 15, with players from the two teams located in Alberta voting to strike on May 19 in accordance with provincial labour laws. This was the first CFL labour strike since 1974. On May 18, the CFL and CFLPA reached a tentative agreement on a new seven-year collective bargaining agreement (CBA). However, on May 23 the players voted against the tentative agreement, despite its approval by the bargaining committee and being recommended by team player reps. On May 26, the CFLPA and CFL agreed to a revised tentative CBA agreement. A few hours later the players voted to ratify the new collective bargaining agreement. The CFL Board of Governors officially ratified the agreement on May 31. Topics of negotiation include compensation, partially guaranteed contracts, revenue sharing, player safety, and league revenue generation following two seasons heavily impacted by the COVID-19 pandemic in Canada. However, much of the debate revolved around the Canadian-American player ratios.

The 2022 salary cap was $5,350,000 ($118,888 per active roster spot).  Minimum salaries were $65,000 for National and American Players and $54,000 for Global Players.  This was the last year minimum salaries were tiered (in 2023, the minimum rose to $70,000 for the entire league).  Players also share $136,111 per club ratification bonus and $100,000 per club in community relations payments.

Schedule
The league released the season's full schedule on December 16, 2021, just four days after the 108th Grey Cup. The league returned to an 18-game schedule following a pandemic-shortened 2021 CFL season. The regular season began on June 9, with the Calgary Stampeders hosting the Montreal Alouettes. The Grey Cup rematch game between the Winnipeg Blue Bombers and Hamilton Tiger-Cats did not occur until week 3, which was the first time since 2018 that this game was not featured in week 1 of the regular season. Similar to the planned 2020 CFL season and the schedule from 2021, this year again featured more intra-divisional games, with BC, Calgary, and Edmonton playing 12 such games, Saskatchewan and Winnipeg playing 11 divisional games, and the East Division teams playing 10 divisional games. This was done to reduce cross-country travel.

The schedule featured all intra-divisional matchups in the last two weeks of the regular season. This year also featured more home-and-home matchups, with every team having at least two and Saskatchewan, Toronto, and Ottawa having five of these matchups. The Toronto Argonauts played a neutral site game on July 16 against the Saskatchewan Roughriders at Raymond Field, in Wolfville, Nova Scotia; with the stadium capacity increased from 3,000 to 10,000. It was the first CFL match held in Atlantic Canada since the 2019 season. All previous regular season games of the Touchdown Atlantic series were held in Moncton, New Brunswick. Tickets for the match sold out in less than one hour.

Rule changes 
On April 27, the league announced a series of rule changes with the intention of improving game flow, and increasing offensive production.

 Narrowing of the field hashmarks from 28 yards from the sidelines instead of 24, making them nine yards apart instead of 17. This centralized the offence in the middle of the field, increasing the effective space the defence had to cover. It also aligned field goal kickers closer to the uprights so they did not have to kick on such drastic angles, which improved accuracy, and thus scoring.
 Increasing the no-yards penalties on punts from 5 yards to 15 yards. Previously special teams were willing to take a five-yard penalty to prevent a longer punt return.
 Changing the starting location of the offence. Kickoffs were moved back from the 35-yard line to the 30-yard line. After a field goal or a single rouge the team that was scored on could scrimmage from the 40-yard line instead of the 35-yard line. Both of these changes had the effect of the offence starting their drives closer to the opposition end-zone.
 Punting teams were also penalized for any ball that went out of bounds before the opponent’s 15-yard line, instead of the 20-yard line.
 A communications coordinator from the officiating department was on the sidelines of each team to enable faster communication between head coaches and on field officials.
 Expansion of the types of plays the Command Centre could review without requiring a coach’s challenge or an officials’ huddle (possession rulings, boundary rulings and administrative rules such as a formation without an end or ineligible receivers downfield)
 Teams were allowed to have two quarterbacks on the field at one time to allow creative plays.
 Penalties that occurred at the end of the first or third quarters could be applied to the start of the next quarter.
 Quarterbacks who fake giving themselves up were assessed an objectionable conduct penalty.
 Automatic ejection of any player for two unnecessary roughness or objectionable conduct penalties.

Player movement

Free agency
The 2022 free agency period officially began on February 8 at 12:00 p.m. ET. Pending free agents and teams were able to negotiate offers for one week starting January 30 and ending February 6. All formal offers to a player during this time were sent to both the league and the players union and could not be rescinded.

Regular season

Standings

Postseason

The Grey Cup was played at Mosaic Stadium in Regina, Saskatchewan, on November 20. The Toronto Argonauts won their league leading 18th Grey Cup and their first since the 2017 season.

Playoff bracket

Broadcasting
The CFL continued to be broadcast on TSN and RDS across all platforms in Canada as part of their current contract. The broadcast rights were extended through 2025. The CFL entered a new partnership with Visaic providing streaming options for 130 countries and territories around the world. This service is available to anyone outside of Canada, the United Kingdom, Ireland, and the United States, where the rights are held by TSN, RDS, ESPN and BT Sports. Prices ranged from US$4.99 for a single game, to $99.99 for every regular season and playoff game.

Award winners

CFL Top Performers of the Week

Source

CFL Top Performers of the Month

Source

2022 CFL All-Stars

Offence 
QB – Zach Collaros, Winnipeg Blue Bombers
RB – Ka'Deem Carey, Calgary Stampeders
R – Dalton Schoen, Winnipeg Blue Bombers
R – Eugene Lewis, Montreal Alouettes
R – Dominique Rhymes, BC Lions
R – Tim White, Hamilton Tiger-Cats
R – Kurleigh Gittens Jr., Toronto Argonauts
OT – Stanley Bryant, Winnipeg Blue Bombers
OT – Derek Dennis, Calgary Stampeders
OG – Brandon Revenberg, Hamilton Tiger-Cats
OG – Patrick Neufeld, Winnipeg Blue Bombers
C – Sean McEwen, Calgary Stampeders

Defence 
DT – Mike Rose, Calgary Stampeders
DT – Jake Ceresna, Edmonton Elks
DE – Lorenzo Mauldin IV, Ottawa Redblacks
DE – Shawn Lemon, Calgary Stampeders
LB – Wynton McManis, Toronto Argonauts
LB – Cameron Judge, Calgary Stampeders
CLB – Kameron Kelly, Hamilton Tiger-Cats
CB – Jamal Peters,  Toronto Argonauts
CB – Garry Peters,  BC Lions
HB – Marcus Sayles, BC Lions
HB – Deatrick Nichols, Winnipeg Blue Bombers
S – Loucheiz Purifoy, BC Lions

Special teams 
K – Rene Paredes, Calgary Stampeders
P – Cody Grace, Calgary Stampeders
ST – Janarion Grant, Winnipeg Blue Bombers

Source

2022 CFL Western All-Stars

Offence 
QB – Zach Collaros, Winnipeg Blue Bombers
RB – Ka'Deem Carey, Calgary Stampeders
R – Dalton Schoen, Winnipeg Blue Bombers
R – Dominique Rhymes, BC Lions
R – Nic Demski, Winnipeg Blue Bombers
R – Malik Henry, Calgary Stampeders
R – Kenny Lawler, Edmonton Elks
OT – Stanley Bryant, Winnipeg Blue Bombers
OT – Derek Dennis, Calgary Stampeders
OG – Patrick Neufeld, Winnipeg Blue Bombers
OG – Ryan Sceviour, Calgary Stampeders
C – Sean McEwen, Calgary Stampeders

Defence 
DT – Jake Ceresna, Edmonton Elks
DT – Mike Rose, Calgary Stampeders
DE – Willie Jefferson, Winnipeg Blue Bombers
DE – Shawn Lemon, Calgary Stampeders
LB – Adam Bighill, Winnipeg Blue Bombers
LB – Cameron Judge, Calgary Stampeders
CLB – Derrick Moncrief, Saskatchewan Roughriders
CB – Garry Peters,  BC Lions
CB – Jonathan Moxey, Calgary Stampeders
HB – Marcus Sayles, BC Lions
HB – Deatrick Nichols, Winnipeg Blue Bombers
S – Loucheiz Purifoy, BC Lions

Special teams 
K – Rene Paredes, Calgary Stampeders
P – Cody Grace, Calgary Stampeders
ST – Janarion Grant, Winnipeg Blue Bombers

Source

2022 CFL Eastern All-Stars

Offence 
QB – McLeod Bethel-Thompson, Toronto Argonauts
RB – A.J. Ouellette, Toronto Argonauts
R – Eugene Lewis, Montreal Alouettes
R – Kurleigh Gittens Jr., Toronto Argonauts
R – Jaelon Acklin, Ottawa Redblacks
R – Tim White, Hamilton Tiger-Cats
R – Steven Dunbar Jr., Hamilton Tiger-Cats
OT – Dejon Allen, Toronto Argonauts
OT – Landon Rice, Montreal Alouettes
OG – Brandon Revenberg, Hamilton Tiger-Cats
OG – Jacob Ruby, Ottawa Redblacks
C – Justin Lawrence, Toronto Argonauts

Defence 
DT – Micah Johnson, Hamilton Tiger-Cats
DT – Shawn Oakman, Toronto Argonauts
DE – Lorenzo Mauldin IV, Ottawa Redblacks
DE – Julian Howsare, Hamilton Tiger-Cats
LB – Wynton McManis, Toronto Argonauts
LB – Jovan Santos-Knox, Hamilton Tiger-Cats
CLB – Kameron Kelly, Hamilton Tiger-Cats
CB – Jamal Peters,  Toronto Argonauts
CB – Jumal Rolle, Hamilton Tiger-Cats
HB – Richard Leonard, Hamilton Tiger-Cats
HB – Wesley Sutton, Montreal Alouettes
S – Tunde Adeleke, Hamilton Tiger-Cats

Special teams 
K – Seth Small, Hamilton Tiger-Cats
P – John Haggerty, Toronto Argonauts
ST – Chandler Worthy, Montreal Alouettes

Source

2022 CFL Awards
 CFL's Most Outstanding Player Award – Zach Collaros (QB), Winnipeg Blue Bombers
 CFL's Most Outstanding Canadian Award – Nathan Rourke (QB), BC Lions
 CFL's Most Outstanding Defensive Player Award – Lorenzo Mauldin IV (DL), Ottawa Redblacks
 CFL's Most Outstanding Offensive Lineman Award – Stanley Bryant (OT), Winnipeg Blue Bombers
 CFL's Most Outstanding Rookie Award – Dalton Schoen (WR), Winnipeg Blue Bombers
 John Agro Special Teams Award – Mario Alford (KR), Saskatchewan Roughriders
 Tom Pate Memorial Award – Emmanuel Arceneaux (WR), Edmonton Elks
 Jake Gaudaur Veterans' Trophy – Dan Clark (OL), Saskatchewan Roughriders
 Annis Stukus Trophy – Mike O'Shea, Winnipeg Blue Bombers
 Commissioner's Award – Jeff Harbin, long time CFL official
 Hugh Campbell Distinguished Leadership Award – Rick LeLacheur, BC Lions president and CEO
 Jane Mawby Tribute Award - Gail Mund, Saskatchewan Roughriders director of ticket operations

References

Canadian Football League seasons
2022 in Canadian football